Mount Carbon may refer to:

Places

United States
 Mount Carbon, Illinois
 Mount Carbon, Pennsylvania
 Mount Carbon, West Virginia